Harlardus (or Alhheard or Eahlheard) was a medieval Bishop of Dorchester.

Harlardus was consecrated between 869 and 888 and died between 893 and 896.

Citations

References

External links
 

Bishops of Dorchester (Mercia)
896 deaths
Year of birth unknown